Catholic Central High School (CCH) in London, was Ontario's first Jr. Catholic High School, opened with grades 7 to 13 in September 1950. The new building was a Junior High School with grades 7 to 10. The original building on site was formerly known as Sacred Heart Convent and it housed 11, 12, 13 for a number of years but dropped grades 7, 8 when enrolment in grades 9 & 10 increased. CCH is administered by the London District Catholic School Board.

The school  has a wider range of programs than other London region high schools, such as the International Baccalaureate Diploma Programme, Environmental Leadership Program, English as a Second Language program and the Music Extension program, which mostly caters to graduates of St. Mary Choir School. It also has a co-op program called LEAP (Leaders in Exercise Athletics Program). CCH attracts students from the downtown area as well as the greater London region.

History

Catholic Central High School, named after the high school of the same name in Detroit, Michigan, was opened in September 1950 in what had been the Sacred Heart Convent. It consisted of grades XI, XII and XII. The Sisters of St. Joseph taught the girls and the commercial classes and the Christian Brothers taught the boys in the general classes under associate principalships held by Sr. Mary Angela and Brother Stanislaus respectively. By January 5, 1951, the Catholic Central sports teams had adopted the name Crusaders. The girls were known as Crusaderettes. It was about the autumn of 1952 that the words to the "Crusader Song" were composed by Barry McIlhargey, a grade XII student and football player. Meanwhile, the cornerstone for Sacred Heart Separate School, to the immediate west of Catholic Central High School was laid on December 8, 1951. By the time the school was officially opened on September 14, 1952, the school's name had been changed to Catholic Central Separate School (CCSS) and consisted of grades VII, VIII, IX and X. Sr. Elaine Dunn was its first principal. With the opening of CCSS, St. Angela's College, De La Salle High School and Sacred Heart Commercial closed their doors and their pupils were now absorbed into Catholic Central Separate School. The Christian Brothers also left London and Fr. Joe Finn, a diocesan priest, took Brother Stanislaus' place as associate principal. Father Dominic A. Kirwan, C.R. succeeded Fr. Finn in September 1952. In the fall of 1958 the construction of a new building for Catholic Central High School (CCHS) was begun to the west of Catholic Central Separate School. It opened for its first students in September 1959. In September 1963, CCHS was placed under the principalship of the Oblates of Mary Immaculate with Fr. Harold Conway as principal. The Board had first attempted to entice the Basilans to taken over the running of the school but the latter declined. In 1967, CCHS and Catholic Central Separate School, which for a number of years held only grade IX and X students, were joined under one principalship, with Fr. Conway as the first principle for grades IX-XIII A "tunnel" which was half above ground, was constructed to physically unite the two structures, which became known as the East Wing and the West Wing  Owing to an increase in student population, a total of 14 portables were added between 1970 and 1972.  The north wing which accommodates the Fine Arts & Family Studies programs was constructed in 1986.

In 1997 and 1998, a massive renovation was begun.  This renovation included the complete renovation of both the east and west wings as well as an addition which unified both wings and added a new chapel, atrium, library, technology wing, new computer and science labs, gymnasiums, cafeteria and administration, guidance and office area.

Athletics

CCH has a rich history of athletic pride and achievement. CCH has an athletics Wall of Champions located in their gym that was created in 2008; The wall displays championship winning team in the school history. There is also an athletic Wall of Fame, which displays the greatest athletes and coaches who have been a part of Crusader Athletics. In 2013/2014 Catholic Central achieved the first "triple crown" in London since 1983, winning a TVRAA championship in football, hockey, and basketball. This included the Crusader football team's 20th TVRAA championship.

Notable alumni
 Anne Marie DeCicco-Best - former Mayor of London
 John Ferris - former MPP for London South
 
 Pete Howard - CFL Football player (Hamilton Tiger Cats)
 Carol Off - Canadian television and radio journalist, associated with CBC Television and CBC Radio 
 Brendan Shanahan - NHL Hockey player (New Jersey Devils)
 Ryan Thelwell - CFL Football player (Calgary Stampeders)

See also
List of high schools in Ontario

References

Educational institutions established in 1950
International Baccalaureate schools in Ontario
High schools in London, Ontario
1950 establishments in Ontario
Catholic secondary schools in Ontario